Habenaria sahyadrica is a species of orchid. It is native to the Western Ghats in India.

References

sahyadrica
Endemic orchids of India